Farissa Evelin Córdoba Martínez (born 30 June 1989) is a Panamanian footballer who plays as a goalkeeper for Israeli Ligat Nashim club Maccabi Holon FC and the Panama women's national team.

International career
Córdoba appeared in two matches for Panama at the 2018 CONCACAF Women's Championship.

See also
 List of Panama women's international footballers

References

1989 births
Living people
Sportspeople from Panama City
Panamanian women's footballers
Women's association football goalkeepers
Maccabi Holon F.C. (women) players
Ligat Nashim players
Panama women's international footballers
Panamanian expatriate women's footballers
Panamanian expatriate sportspeople in Ecuador
Expatriate women's footballers in Ecuador
Panamanian expatriate sportspeople in Israel
Expatriate women's footballers in Israel